Driloleirus is an earthworm genus in the family Megascolecidae.

This genus includes at least two species:
 Driloleirus americanus – giant Palouse earthworm, Washington giant earthworm
 Driloleirus macelfreshi – Oregon giant earthworm

References

Megascolecidae
Annelid genera
Taxonomy articles created by Polbot